The Boulton & Paul P.3 Bobolink was a World War I British single-engined single-seat fighter aircraft. It was built by Boulton & Paul Ltd.

Development and design
The Bobolink was the first aeroplane designed by Boulton & Paul Limited of Norwich. The company was a manufacturer of wooden buildings but during World War I it, like many other companies, built aircraft under Ministry contracts. Aircraft built included the Sopwith 1½ Strutter and Sopwith Camel.

The British Air Ministry requested proposals to replace the Sopwith Camel. Boulton & Paul designed and constructed the Bobolink and entered it in that competition. The prototype first flew in early 1918, undergoing official trials in March of that year.

The Bobolink had two-bay biplane wings and was powered by the same Bentley BR2 rotary engine as used by the competing Sopwith Snipe. An unusual feature of the aircraft was the use of jettisonable fuel tanks. These were fitted behind the pilot and separated by a sheet of armour, allowing an individual tank to be jettisoned in the event of a fire. While the Bobolink and Snipe had similar performance, the Snipe was easier to build, while the Bobolink was claimed to have poor ground handling, with the Snipe winning the Camel replacement competition. Only a single prototype was produced.

Specifications

See also

References
Notes

Bibliography

External links
Boulton & Paul Bobolink – British Aircraft Directory

Cancelled military aircraft projects of the United Kingdom
Bobolink
1910s British fighter aircraft
Rotary-engined aircraft
Single-engined tractor aircraft
Biplanes
Aircraft first flown in 1918